Celia Barrios Mazariegos de Reina (1 January 1834 - 5 July 1897) was the mother of President José María Reina Barrios and the 1st First Mother of Guatemala, and the sister of President Justo Rufino Barrios.

Celia Barrios and Mazariegos was born in San Marcos in 1834, daughter of Simon Barrios and Antolina Mazariegos, and married Joaquín Reyna, in 1850. They were the parents of José María, Manuel, María and María Antonia.

When her son General José María Reina Barrios reached the presidency on 12 March 1892, Mrs. Barrios was proclaimed "First Mother of the Nation", being the first country in which this term was used and being his only successor Mrs. Joaquina Cabrera, mother of the lawyer Manuel Estrada Cabrera.

She died on July 5, 1897 while she was sleeping. Three days of national mourning were declared, the national flag waved at half mast; she was buried in San Marcos.

Citations

References
 
 
 
 
 

1834 births
1897 deaths
People from San Marcos Department
19th-century women
19th-century Guatemalan people